The Pit and the Pendulum is a 1964 French featurette horror film directed by Alexandre Astruc and starring Maurice Ronet. It tells the story of a prisoner sentenced to death who is tormented by the Spanish Inquisition. The film is based on the 1842 short story with the same title by Edgar Allan Poe.

The film was produced through Radiodiffusion-Télévision Française. It premiered on 9 January 1964.

Plot

Film historian Gordon Gow provides this film summary:

References

External links
 The Pit and the Pendulum at Ina.fr 

1964 horror films
Films based on The Pit and the Pendulum
Films directed by Alexandre Astruc
French horror films
French short films
1964 short films
1964 films
Horror featurettes
1960s French films